Kianguenyi is a settlement in Kenya's Central Province.

Its six kilometres from Kerugoya town.

Notable people include Peter waing'ata.

References 

Populated places in Central Province (Kenya)